Martín Sebastián Prost (born 11 July 1988) is an Argentine footballer who plays as a striker for The Strongest.

Career

In 2011, Prost signed for Argentine third tier side Huracán de Tres Arroyos. In 2012, he signed for CAI in the Argentine fourth tier. In 2013, Prost signed for Argentine second tier club Sarmiento, where he made 8 appearances and scored 0 goals. On 7 October 2013, he debuted for Sarmiento during a 1-2 loss to Instituto. In 2014, Prost signed for Gimnasia de Mendoza in the Argentine third tier. 

In 2016, he signed for Argentine second tier team Juventud Unida (Gualeguaychú). In 2018, he signed for Sport Boys in Bolivia. In 2019, Prost signed for Argentine outfit Quilmes. In 2021, he signed for Independiente Petrolero in Bolivia, helping them win their only league title. He was the top scorer of the 2021 Bolivian Primera División with 18 goals.

References

External links

 

Argentine footballers
Living people
Association football forwards
1988 births
Sport Boys footballers
Bolivian Primera División players
Torneo Federal A players
Primera Nacional players
Gimnasia y Esgrima de Jujuy footballers
Gimnasia y Esgrima de Concepción del Uruguay footballers
Club Atlético Sarmiento footballers
Gimnasia y Esgrima de Mendoza footballers
Comisión de Actividades Infantiles footballers

Huracán de Tres Arroyos footballers
The Strongest players
Juventud Unida de Gualeguaychú players
Quilmes Atlético Club footballers
Club Agropecuario Argentino players
Club Independiente Petrolero players
Argentine expatriate sportspeople in Bolivia
Argentine expatriate footballers
Sportspeople from Buenos Aires Province
Argentine people of Volga German descent